Tynskya is a genus of messelasturid bird. It is known from a fossil of the North American Green River Formation and the London Clay Formation of England, both from the early Eocene.

References

Prehistoric bird genera
Eocene birds
Prehistoric birds of North America
Prehistoric birds of Europe
Fossil taxa described in 2000
Neognathae